Charissa Cree Chamorro (born April 26, 1977, in Baytown, Texas) is a clinical psychologist and American television personality of Chilean heritage specializing in the treatment of anxiety, depression and sleep-related issues.

Chamorro is a frequent media contributor and her expertise has been featured in Time, Forbes, Parents, People, Insider, Healthline, Men's Health, Vox, the Huffington Post and Newsweek. 

She has presented her research at conferences nationwide, and has been awarded fellowships in research and statistics. She has contributed to research on pediatric OCD and anxiety disorders, and has conducted research on the long-term effects of child abuse and exposure to community violence, and on the identification of factors that contribute to anxiety and mood disorders.

Chamorro completed clinical training at Columbia University Clinic for Anxiety and Related Disorders (CUCARD), Children's Day Unit at New York State Psychiatric Institute, Mount Sinai Center for OCD and Related Disorders and Mount Sinai Adolescent Health Center.

She was a featured contributor on NBC's Doc to Doc with Dr. John Torres and her television and film career includes leading roles on such soap operas as Guiding Light as Tory Granger (2001–2002) and One Life to Live as Sophia Pellegrino (1999–2001), for which she won the 2001 OLTL Soap Central Award for Outstanding Supporting Actress and Outstanding Newcomer. Charissa starred in the feature film Hysterical Psycho, had guest starring roles on Law & Order and Law & Order: Criminal Intent, and has worked extensively in theater.

Chamorro received her PhD in Clinical Psychology from Long Island University, earned a master's degree in Social Work from New York University, a master's degree in psychology from Long Island University, and received her Bachelor of Fine Arts degree from Boston University.

She has also worked with advocacy and social service programs throughout New York City. Her work as a movement instructor for pediatric cancer patients inspired her to pursue a career as a clinical psychologist with a specialty in child and adolescent psychology.

Filmography

References

External links

YouTube - Charissa Chamorro
Soap Central

Living people
1977 births
Actresses from Texas
American people of Chilean descent
Hispanic and Latino American actresses
People from Baytown, Texas
American soap opera actresses
American television actresses
20th-century American actresses
21st-century American actresses
American stage actresses
Boston University alumni